= Mark Shlomchik =

American immunologist

Mark Jay Shlomchik is an American immunologist. He is currently UPMC Endowed Professor and chair at the University of Pittsburgh.
